Fellows of the Royal Society elected in 1891.

Fellows

 William Anderson (1835–1898)
 Frederick Orpen Bower (1855–1948)
 John Conroy (1845–1900)
 Daniel John Cunningham (1850–1909)
 George Mercer Dawson (1849–1901)
 Edwin Bailey Elliott (1851–1937)
 Percy Faraday Frankland (1858–1946)
 Percy Carlyle Gilchrist (1851–1935)
 William Dobinson Halliburton (1860–1931)
 James Hannen (1821–1894)
 Oliver Heaviside (1850–1925)
 William Lawies Jackson (1840–1917)
 John Edward Marr (1857–1933)
 Ludwig Mond (1839–1909)
 Sir William Napier Shaw (1854–1945)
 Silvanus Phillips Thompson (1851–1916)
 Thomas Henry Tizard (1839–1924)

Foreign members

 Alexander Agassiz (1835–1910) ForMemRS
 Benjamin Apthorp Gould (1824–1896) ForMemRS
 Eduard Adolf Strasburger (1844–1912) ForMemRS
 Pietro Tacchini (1838–1905) ForMemRS

References

1891 in science
1891
1891 in the United Kingdom